Lukas Kohler (born 24 May 1987) is a German footballer who plays for SV Elversberg.

Honours
Oberliga Südwest (V): 2009
Regionalliga West (IV): 2010

References

External links

1987 births
Living people
German footballers
1. FC Saarbrücken players
1. FC Heidenheim players
3. Liga players
Regionalliga players
Association football defenders
Sportspeople from Saarbrücken